All Life Records was a French jazz record label.

Discography
 001: Christian Escoudé & Charlie Haden – Gitane
 002: Jimmy Rowles– Red 'n' Me
 003: Burton Greene – The Past Is Also in the Future
 004: Cat Anderson – Old Folks
 005: Bud Freeman – Satin Doll
 006: Christian Escoudé – Gousti
 007: Chet Baker – Two a Day
 008: Eddie "Lockjaw" Davis & Harry Edison – All of Me
 010: Daniel Humair, Eddy Louiss & Jean-Luc Ponty – HLP
 012: Maurice Vander – Philly
 013: Eddy Louiss – Blue Tempo
 015: Daniel Humair, Eddy Louiss & Jean-Luc Ponty – Last Set
 017: John Lewis – Piano, Paris 1979

External links
Discogs

French record labels
Jazz record labels